YISS may refer to:

Yongsan International School of Seoul, an international school in Seoul, South Korea
Yusof Ishak Secondary School, a secondary school in Bukit Batok, Singapore